Robbie Grace (born 14 June 1954) is a South African former professional snooker player.

Career

Born in 1954, Grace turned professional in 1985, but the only tournament he entered that season was the 1986 World Championship. In his first match as a professional, he beat Maurice Parkin 10–8, but he lost in the second round of qualifying 3–10 to Wayne Jones.

Despite only winning one match, Grace began the next season ranked 63rd of the 118 players on the main tour; he entered five tournaments during that season, including the 1986 UK Championship, where he recorded the best performance of his career. There, he beat Pat Houlihan 9–6, Paul Medati 9–6 and Murdo MacLeod 9–6 to reach the last 32, but he was eliminated at this stage 9–1 by Willie Thorne.

The furthest Grace progressed in any tournament thereafter was a last-48 finish in Event 1 of the WPBSA Non-Ranking series during the 1988–89 season; however, he played his first match in the event at this stage, and lost 3–5 to David Greaves.

Between 1990 and 1992, Grace played nine matches, but could not win any. His last victory had come in the first qualifying round of the 1990 World Championship, where he beat Anthony Harris 10–8 but lost in the second round 9–10 to Dave Gilbert. Having not played at all during the 1991/1992 season, he was relegated from the tour at its conclusion, ranked 193rd.

He won the South African Amateur Championship in 1977.

He entered the South African Professional Championship during the 1980s, finishing as runner-up in the 1989 edition, losing 5–8 to Perrie Mans.

References

South African snooker players
1954 births
Living people
Sportspeople from Cape Town